Gigantoid is the eleventh album by American stoner rock band Fu Manchu. It was released on April 29, 2014 on At The Dojo Records. The album features "a slightly more primitive, raw and ultra fuzzed-out sound" than previous releases.

Initially released as a 2013 split seven-inch single with psych-metal trio Moab, "Robotic Invasion" appears as a bonus track on the digital version of Gigantoid.

Track listing

Personnel
Scott Hill – vocals, guitar
Bob Balch – guitar
Brad Davis – bass
Scott Reeder – drums

Production
Artwork by Kieron Cropper 
Mastered by Gene Grimaldi
Produced by Andrew Giacumakis and Fu Manchu
Recorded, engineered, and mixed by Andrew Giacumakis

References

Fu Manchu (band) albums
2014 albums